Tarare is a commune in the Rhône department in eastern France. It lies on the Turdine river, 28 miles west-northwest of Lyon by rail.

History

The city was founded at the beginning of the 12th century, as the priory of Tarare by the Savigny Abbey. Only weavers, shoemakers and tanners lived there, in addition to a few merchants and innkeepers. In the 16th century, plagues decimated the population to the point that the consulate of Lyon initiated a special quest to aid the people in Tarare.

In the 1850s, silk mills at Tarare were taking on unmarried young women aged between thirteen and fifteen as apprentices. The girls had to provide birth certificates and proof of vaccination. As well as getting wages, they had their board and lodging, so that they worked away from home. There was a 12-hour working day, and the girls were taught reading, writing, and arithmetic. After a three-year apprenticeship, they could continue to work at the mill.

In 1874, C. B. Black's Guide to France, Belgium, Holland, &c said of Tarare: 

A now archaic description of the early 20th-century economy is provided by the Encyclopædia Britannica Eleventh Edition:

Population

Notable people
Jean-Baptiste Vietty, sculptor
Louis Sonnery-Martin, politician 
Antoine Deflotrière, cyclist
Jean Jourlin, wrestler 
Roger-Arnould Rivière, poet
David Christie,  singer
Anne-Laure Casseleux, footballer
Corentin Tolisso, footballer

See also
 Communes of the Rhône department
 Villefranche - Tarare Airport

References

External links 
 
Documents sur Tarare, tarare.free.fr

Communes of Rhône (department)
Lyonnais